The Best of 1979–1988: Vol 2 is the third compilation, and the second double set of greatest hits by Modus, released on Open Music in 1998.

Track listing 
{{tracklist
| total_length    = 72:10
| headline        = One 
| extra_column    = Featured artist(s)
| all_writing     = Lehotský and Peteraj, except for the tracks 2 and 6 (Lehotský and Filan)

| title1          = Modus
| extra1          = Ján Lehotský, Miroslav Žbirka and Marika Gombitová
| note1           = taken from Modus
| length1         = 2:47

| title2          = Prázdny rám
| extra2          = Lehotský
| note2           = taken from Modus
| length2         = 4:59

| title3          = Pripútaná
| extra3          = Gombitová
| note3           = taken from Modus
| length3         = 4:58

| title4          = Vieš byť zlá
| extra4          = Žbirka
| note4           = taken from Modus
| length4         = 4:17

| title5          = Slávnosť kvetín
| extra5          = Gombitová
| note5           = taken from Modus
| length5         = 3:39

| title6          = Ja a ty
| extra6          = Lehotský
| note6           = taken from Balíček snov
| length6         = 4:36

| title7          = Pacient
| extra7          = Lehotský
| note7           = taken from Balíček snov
| length7         = 5:20

| title8          = Ruleta
| extra8          = Gombitová
| note8           = taken from Balíček snov
| length8         = 3:06

| title9          = Báječní muži na lietajúcich strojoch
| extra9          = Gombitová
| note9           = taken from Balíček snov
| length9         = 3:23

| title10         = Naposledy
| extra10         = Lehotský
| note10          = taken from Balíček snov
| length10        = 3:39

| title11         = Dotyk
| extra11         = Gombitová
| note11          = taken from 99 zápaliek
| length11        = 5:10

| title12         = Zmrzlinár s bielou čapicou
| extra12         = Lehotský
| note12          = taken from 99 zápaliek
| length12        = 3:54

| title13         = Zimný park
| extra13         = Lehotský and Gombitová
| note13          = taken from 99 zápaliek
| length13        = 3:39

| title14         = Keď nastúpia veteráni
| extra14         = Lehotský
| note14          = taken from Záhradná kaviareň
| length14        = 2:12

| title15         = Záhradná kaviareň
| extra15         = Gombitová
| note15          = taken from Záhradná kaviareň| length15        = 3:53

| title16         = Sťahovák
| extra16         = Lehotský
| note16          = taken from Záhradná kaviareň| length16        = 4:05

| title17         = Haliere
| extra17         = Lehotský and Gombitová
| note17          = taken from Záhradná kaviareň| length17        = 4:45

| title18         = Medové srdce
| extra18         = Lehotský
| note18          = taken from Záhradná kaviareň| length18        = 3:48
}}

Official releases
 1998: Modus'', 2CD, Open, #0064 2312

Credits and personnel

 Ján Lehotský - lead vocal, writer, keyboards
 Marika Gombitová - lead vocal, back vocal
 Miroslav Žbirka - lead vocal, chorus, electric and acoustic guitar
 Kamil Peteraj - lyrics
 Boris Filan - lyrics
 Ján Lauko - producer

 Ján Hangoni - lead vocal
 Marián Greksa - lead vocal
 Ľuboš Stankovský - lead vocal
 Milan Vyskočáni
 Ivona Novotná - lead vocal
 Jozef Paulíny - lead vocal

References

General

Specific

1998 compilation albums
Modus (band) compilation albums